Bishops of Smolensk were the Catholic bishops of Smolensk diocese (formed in 1611, mostly liquidated in 1667, finally liquidated in 1809).

Diocesan bishops
Piotr Parczewski 1636–1649
Franciszek Dołmat Isajkowski  1650–1654
Hieronim Władysław Sanguszko 1655–1657
Jerzy Białłozor  1658–1661
Kazimierz Pac 1664–1667
Gothard Jan Tyzenhaus 1668–1669
Aleksander Kotowicz 1673–1685
Konstanty Kazimierz Brzostowski 1685–1687
Eustachy Kotowicz 1688–1704
Jan Mikołaj Zgierski 1706–1710
Aleksander Mikołaj Horain  1711–1716
Ludwik Karol Ogiński 1717–1718
Karol Piotr Pancerzyński 1721–1724
Bogusław Korwin Gosiewski  1725–1744
Jerzy Mikołaj Hylzen  1745–1763
Gabriel Wodzyński 1772–1788
Adam Stanisław Naruszewicz 1788–1790
Tymoteusz Paweł Gorzeński 1790–1809

Suffragan bishops
Gabriel Wodzyński 1759–1772 
Adam Stanisław Naruszewicz 1775–1788

References 

 Smolensk